Hugh Frederick Michael Morres (8 July 1876 – 28 January 1934) was an English first-class cricketer and educator.

The son of the Reverend Hugh Redmond Morres and his wife, Sophia Jane Powys, he was born at Wokingham, Berkshire. He was educated at Winchester College, before going up to Keble College, Oxford.

He debuted in minor counties cricket for Berkshire in the 1897 Minor Counties Championship against Worcestershire, the year before going up Keble College. He made two appearances in first-class cricket for Oxford University against Sussex in 1898 at Hove, before making a second and final appearance for Oxford in 1899 against the Marylebone Cricket Club at Lord's.

After graduating from Oxford he moved into teaching, as well as continuing to the play minor counties cricket. He briefly played for Dorset in 1903 and 1905, thereafter returning to represent Berkshire. He served during the First World War in the Royal Marines, holding the temporary rank of second lieutenant. Morres was teaching at Eastbourne College in 1923, when he resigned his commission with the rank of lieutenant. Following the war, he made infrequent appearances for Berkshire up until 1923. He was later the games master at Elizabeth College, Guernsey. He married Edith Manuela Forbes in 1901, with the couple having three children.

He died at Swanage, Dorset in January 1934. His son, Archibald, played first-class cricket, as did his uncles, Thomas Morres and Elliot Morres.

References

External links

1876 births
1934 deaths
People from Wokingham
People educated at Winchester College
Alumni of Keble College, Oxford
Schoolteachers from Berkshire
Berkshire cricketers
Oxford University cricketers
Dorset cricketers
Royal Marines personnel of World War I
Royal Marines officers
English cricketers
Military personnel from Berkshire